Bertram Raikes Wodehouse Currie (25 November 1827 – 29 December 1896) was a British banker, and High Sheriff of the County of London from 1892 to 1893.

Early life
He was born at Harley Street, Marylebone, London, on 25 November 1827, the son of the banker and politician Raikes Currie and his wife the Hon. Laura Sophia Wodehouse, daughter of John Wodehouse, 1st Baron Wodehouse. He was educated at Eton College from 1840 to 1845, and afterwards in foreign languages in Weimar, Germany. His younger brother Philip Currie, 1st Baron Currie (1834–1906), was a diplomat, Ambassador to the Ottoman Empire from 1893 to 1898 and Ambassador to Italy from 1898 to 1902.

Marriage
On 31 October 1860, Currie married Caroline Louisa Young (1836/7–1902), the daughter of Sir William Lawrence Young, 4th Baronet, Conservative MP for Buckinghamshire from 1835 to 1842. They had two sons.

They lived at Minley Manor in Hampshire, which he inherited from his father, and at Coombe Warren (now demolished), near Kingston, London, a "suburban villa" built in 1868 by John Galsworthy's father and immortalized in The Forsyte Saga.

Their son, Laurence Currie JP (1867–1934), married Edith Sibyl Mary Finch, the daughter of the politician George Finch.

Death
Currie converted to Roman Catholicism from agnosticism in October 1896, his wife having converted in 1862. He died on 29 December 1896, at 1 Richmond Terrace, Whitehall, London, and was survived by his wife.

References

1827 births
1896 deaths
British bankers
Converts to Roman Catholicism from atheism or agnosticism
English Roman Catholics
High Sheriffs of the County of London
People educated at Eton College
People from Marylebone
Raikes family
19th-century British businesspeople